Kaycee Stroh (born May 29, 1984) is an American actress, singer and dancer, known for her role as Martha Cox in the High School Musical franchise. She was also a contestant in the VH1 reality series Celebrity Fit Club.

Career
Stroh appeared in High School Musical, High School Musical 2 and High School Musical 3 as smart girl Martha Cox, who secretly loved to "pop & lock & jam & break". A professional dance instructor at the Thompson Lane Entertainment Center, her role in the franchise materialized when she took her students to the auditions herself. Along with her fellow cast for the movie, she appeared at the Teen Choice Awards to accept an honorary award charting the film's instant success and at the American Music Awards of 2007 accepting the award for Favorite Album. Stroh also serves as co-host for the dance-along version of High School Musical 2.

She also had a recurring role (2 episodes) in the Disney Channel Original Series, The Suite Life of Zack & Cody as Leslie, a girl who played on the same volleyball team as main characters of the show, London and Maddie. Stroh has also been a guest editor for Tiger Beat magazine. She was also a member of the supporting cast in a direct-to-DVD musical story from Liken the Scriptures called Ammon and King Lamoni. Stroh has worked on occasion as a spokesperson and plus size model for Torrid. She reprised her role as Martha Cox in High School Musical 3: Senior Year, released on October 24, 2008. Stroh was a contestant on Season 7 of Celebrity Fit Club.

Personal life
Stroh was born in Salt Lake City, Utah, the daughter of Cindy and Bruce Stroh. She has two older sisters, both of whom were dancers.

In an interview with People, Stroh discussed her obesity and heavy weight gain and being bed-ridden for three months due to a blood clot in her calf after knee surgery. As well as her television roles, Stroh is also an advocate for Make-A-Wish Foundation, United Cerebral Palsy and Starlight Starbright Children's Foundation.

Stroh married Ben Higginson on January 9, 2009 in the Salt Lake Temple of the Church of Jesus Christ of Latter-day Saints. Zac Efron, Vanessa Hudgens, Ashley Tisdale, Lucas Grabeel, Monique Coleman, Olesya Rulin, Chris Warren Jr., Ryne Sanborn and Kenny Ortega all attended the ring ceremony and reception. They have two daughters, born in May 2013 and October 2015.

Filmography

Music videos

Discography

Soundtracks

Singles

References

External links
 
 Interview at Tommy2.Net
 Interviews with KayCee Stroh on MouseClubhouse.com

1984 births
American film actresses
American Latter Day Saints
American television actresses
Living people
Actresses from Salt Lake City
Latter Day Saints from Utah
Participants in American reality television series
21st-century American women